John Egerton Christmas Piper CH (13 December 1903 – 28 June 1992) was an English painter, printmaker and designer of stained-glass windows and both opera and theatre sets. His work often focused on the British landscape, especially churches and monuments, and included tapestry designs, book jackets, screen-prints, photography, fabrics and ceramics. He was educated at Epsom College and trained at the Richmond School of Art followed by the Royal College of Art in London. He turned from abstraction early in his career, concentrating on a more naturalistic but distinctive approach, but often worked in several different styles throughout his career.

Piper was an official war artist in World War II and his wartime depictions of bomb-damaged churches and landmarks, most notably those of Coventry Cathedral, made Piper a household name and led to his work being acquired by several public collections. Piper collaborated with many others, including the poets John Betjeman and Geoffrey Grigson on the Shell Guides, the potter Geoffrey Eastop and the artist Ben Nicholson. In his later years, he produced many limited-edition prints.

Biography

Early life
John Piper was born in Epsom, Surrey, the youngest of three sons of the solicitor Charles Alfred Piper and his wife Mary Ellen Matthews. Charles Alfred Piper's father, Charles Christmas Piper, had taken over the family bootmaking business, and was also a partner in a printing and stationery company. During Piper's childhood, Epsom was still largely countryside. He went exploring on his bicycle and drew and painted pictures of old churches and monuments on the way. He started making guide books complete with pictures and information at a young age. Piper's brothers both served in the First World War and one of them was killed at Ypres in 1915.

John Piper attended Epsom College from 1919. He did not like the college but found refuge in art. When he left Epsom College in 1922, Piper published a book of poetry and wanted to study to become an artist. However, his father disagreed and insisted he join the family law firm, Piper, Smith & Piper in Westminster. Piper worked beside his father in London for three years, and took articles, but refused the offer of a partnership in the firm. This refusal cost Piper his inheritance but left him free to attend Richmond School of Art. At Richmond, the artist Raymond Coxon prepared Piper for the entrance exams for the Royal College of Art, which he entered in 1928. While studying at Richmond, Piper met Eileen Holding, a fellow student, whom he married in August 1929.

1930s
Piper disliked the regime at the Royal College of Art and left in December 1929. Piper and his wife lived in Hammersmith and held a joint exhibition of their artworks at Heal's in London in 1931. Piper also wrote art and music reviews for several papers and magazines, notably The Nation and Athenaeum.   One such review, of the artist Edward Wadsworth's work, led to an invitation from Ben Nicholson for Piper to join the Seven and Five Society of modern artists. In the following years Piper was involved in a wide variety of projects in several different media. As well as abstract paintings, he produced collages, often with the English landscape or seaside as the subject. He drew a series on Welsh nonconformist chapels, produced articles on English typography and made arts programmes for the BBC. He experimented with placing constructions of dowelling rods over the surface of his canvases and with using mixtures of sand and paint.

With Myfanwy Evans, Piper founded the contemporary art journal Axis in January 1935. As the art critic for The Listener, through working on Axis and by his membership of the London Group and the Seven and Five Society, Piper was at the forefront of the modernist movement in Britain throughout the 1930s. In 1935 Piper and Evans began documenting Early English sculptures in British churches. Piper believed that Anglo-Saxon and Romanesque sculptures, as a popular art form, had parallels with contemporary art. Through Evans, Piper met John Betjeman in 1937 and Betjeman asked Piper to work on the Shell Guides he was editing. Piper wrote and illustrated the guide to Oxfordshire, focusing on rural churches. In March 1938 Stephen Spender asked Piper to design the sets for his production of Trial of a Judge. Piper's first one-man show in May 1938 included abstract paintings, collage landscapes and more conventional landscapes. His second in March 1940 at the Leicester Galleries, featuring several pictures of derelict ruins, was a sell-out.

Piper had first met Myfanwy Evans in 1934 and early the next year when his wife Eileen left him for another artist, Piper and Evans moved into an abandoned farmhouse at Fawley Bottom in the Chilterns near Henley-on-Thames. The farmhouse had no mains electricity, no mains water and no telephone connection. They married in 1937. They gradually converted the farm's outbuildings to studios for their artworks, but it was not until the 1960s that they could afford to modernise the property.

World War II

At the start of World War II, Piper volunteered to work interpreting aerial reconnaissance photographs for the RAF, but was persuaded by Sir Kenneth Clark to work as an official war artist for the War Artists' Advisory Committee (WAAC), which he did from 1940 to 1944 on short-term contracts. Piper was one of only two artists, the other being Meredith Frampton, commissioned to paint inside Air Raid Precaution (ARP) control rooms. Early in 1940 Piper was secretly taken to the ARP underground centre in Bristol, where he painted two pictures.

In November 1940 Piper persuaded the WAAC committee that he should be allowed to concentrate on painting bombed churches. This may have reflected his pre-war conversion to the Anglican faith as much as his previous interest in depicting derelict architectural ruins. The terms of this commission meant Piper would be visiting bombed cities, and other sites, as soon as possible after an air raid: often "the following morning, before the clearing up". Hence he arrived in Coventry the morning after the Coventry Blitz air raid of 14 November 1940 that resulted in 1000 casualties and the destruction of the medieval Coventry Cathedral. Piper made drawings of the cathedral and other gutted churches in the city which he subsequently worked up into oil paintings in his studio. Piper's first painting of the bombed cathedral, Interior of Coventry Cathedral, now exhibited at the Herbert Art Gallery, was described by Jeffery Daniels in The Times as "all the more poignant for the exclusion of a human element". Piper's depiction of the east end of the cathedral was printed as a post-card during the war and sold well. In 1962 the same image was used on the cover of the official souvenir guide to the Cathedral."

After the bombing raids of 24 November 1940 on Bristol, Piper arrived in the city a day, or possibly two, later. Piper only spent a few hours in the city, but his sketches resulted, by January 1941, in three oil paintings of ruined churches: St Mary-le-Port, Bristol, The Temple Church and The Church of the Holy Nativity. Piper also painted bombed churches and other buildings in London and Newport Pagnell, and also spent a week painting in Bath after the Bath Blitz air raids in April 1942. During the summer of 1941, Piper featured in a group exhibition with Henry Moore and Graham Sutherland at Temple Newsam in Leeds. The show was a great success, attracting some 52,000 visitors before touring to other English towns and cities.

In 1943, the WAAC commissioned Piper to go to the disused slate mine at Blaenau Ffestiniog where the paintings from the National Gallery had been evacuated for safety during the Blitz. Piper found conditions in the underground quarry too difficult to work in but did paint some landscapes in the immediate area. He also toured North Wales by bicycle, cycling and climbing to photograph and sketch buildings and views in Harlech, in the Vale of Ffestiniog, on Cader Idris and on Aran Fawddwy. Piper had previously visited Snowdonia in 1939, 1940 and 1941, and often returned there after the war.

Piper was also commissioned by the WAAC to record a series of experiments on bomb shelter designs and land reclamation work. Alongside Vivian Pitchforth, he painted the bombed interior of the House of Commons. In July 1944 the WAAC appointed Piper to the full-time artist post vacated by John Platt at the Ministry of War Transport. In this role Piper painted rail and marine transport scenes in Cardiff, Bristol, Southampton and other south-coast locations. Earlier in the war, he had also painted at the locomotive works in Swindon.

Throughout the war Piper also undertook work for the Recording Britain project, initiated by Kenneth Clark, to paint historic sites thought to be at risk from bombing or neglect. He also undertook some private commissions during the war. Viscount Ridley commissioned him to produce a series of watercolours of Blagdon Hall and this led to a commission from the Royal Family for a series of watercolours of Windsor Castle and Windsor Great Park, which Piper completed by March 1942. The King, George VI was unimpressed with the dark tone of the pictures and commented, "You seem to have very bad luck with your weather, Mr Piper".

Sir Osbert Sitwell invited Piper to Renishaw Hall to paint the house and illustrate an autobiography he was writing. Piper made the first of many visits to the estate in 1942. The family retain 70 of his pictures and there is a display at the hall. Piper painted a similar series at Knole House for Edward Sackville-West. In 1943, Piper received the first of several poster commissions from Ealing Studios. His draft poster for the film The Bells Go Down featured a view of St Paul's Cathedral seen among monumental ruins.

Later life

From 1950 Piper began working in stained glass in partnership with Patrick Reyntiens, whom he had met through John Betjeman. Their first completed commission, for the chapel at Oundle School, led to Basil Spence commissioning them to design the stained-glass baptistry window for the new Coventry Cathedral. They produced an abstract design that occupies the full height of the bowed baptistry, and comprises 195 panes, ranging from white to deep blue. Their depiction of The Supper at Emmaus was installed at Llandaff Cathedral in Cardiff during 1953.

Piper and Reyntiens went on to design large stained-glass windows for the chapel of Robinson College, Cambridge, and The Land Is Bright, a large window in the Washington National Cathedral, as well as windows for many smaller churches. Liverpool Metropolitan Cathedral, completed in 1967, features an innovative stained glass lantern by Piper and Reyntiens. The lantern panels were cemented together with epoxy resin within thin concrete ribs, a technique invented for the job. Side chapels were also framed in glass to their designs. Piper and Reyntiens also made windows for the King George VI Memorial Chapel in St George's Chapel at Windsor Castle.

Piper also designed windows for Eton College Chapel, which were executed by Reyntiens. In total, Piper designed over 60 stained glass window commissions. The last of these was the 1984 memorial window to John Betjeman in All Saints Church at Farnborough in Berkshire.

In 1962 Piper completed the Spirit of Energy murals in fibreglass on the outside of the 1950s built former North Thames Gas Board headquarters on Peterborough Road in Fulham. The building is now known as the Piper Building and the murals were Grade II listed in 2022.

In 1966 Walter Hussey, the Dean of Chichester Cathedral, commissioned Piper to produce a tapestry to enliven the dark area around the high altar of the cathedral. Piper had designed the cope presented to Hussey when he left his previous post in 1955, and for Chichester he produced a very brightly coloured tapestry with an abstract design of the Holy Trinity flanked by the Elements and by the Evangelists. Although the tapestry received a mixed, mostly negative, reaction from the public, Piper was commissioned to create a set of clerical vestments to complement the work in 1967. Piper also created tapestries for Hereford Cathedral and Llandaff Cathedral in Cardiff.

Piper made working visits to south Wales in both 1936 and 1939, and from 1943 to 1951, he made an annual painting trip to Snowdonia. He did not paint in the Welsh mountains after 1951 but did visit, and painted in Aberaeron in 1954. Piper's Snowdonia paintings and drawings were exhibited in New York in September 1947 and in May 1950, on both occasions at Curt Valentin's Buchholz Gallery. The former show was Piper's first large solo show in the United States.

For the Festival of Britain in 1951, the Arts Council of Great Britain commissioned Piper to create a large mural, The Englishman's Home, which consisted of 42 plywood panels and depicted dwellings ranging from cottages to castles. The mural was displayed in a large open porch on the South Bank festival site. Later in the 1950s, Piper produced pioneering designs for furnishing fabrics for Arthur Sanderson & Sons Ltd and David Whitehead Ltd, as part of a movement to bring art and design to the masses. He also designed a number of dust jackets for books, frequently depicting both natural and architectural forms, often in a state of decay, within theatrical framing.

Piper continued to write extensively on modern art in books and articles. From 1946 until 1954, Piper served as a trustee of the Tate Gallery. Throughout the 1960s and 1970s he frequently visited Pembrokeshire to paint. He was a theatre set designer, including for the Kenton Theatre in Henley-on-Thames. He designed many of the premiere productions of Benjamin Britten's operas at Glyndebourne Festival Opera, the Royal Opera House, La Fenice and the Aldeburgh Festival, as well as for some of the operas of Alun Hoddinott. Piper also designed firework displays, most notably for the Silver Jubilee of Elizabeth II in 1977.

Piper was made an Honorary Member of the Printmakers Council.

John Piper died at his home at Fawley Bottom, Buckinghamshire, where he had lived for most of his life with his wife Myfanwy. His children are Clarissa Lewis, the painter Edward Piper (deceased), Susannah Brooks and Sebastian Piper; his grandchildren include painter Luke Piper and sculptor Henry Piper.

Exhibitions
The Tate collection holds 180 of Piper's works, including etchings and some earlier abstractions. Other collections holding Piper's work include the Art Institute of Chicago, Birmingham Museums & Art Gallery, Dallas Museum of Art, National Galleries of Scotland, Beaverbrook Art Gallery, Cheltenham Art Gallery and Museum, Cleveland Museum of Art, Currier Gallery of Art, Hirshhorn Museum and Sculpture Garden, Indianapolis Museum of Art, Manchester City Art Gallery, Norwich Museums, Pallant House Gallery, Philadelphia Museum of Art, Southampton City Art Gallery, The Hepworth Wakefield, The Priseman Seabrook Collection, the Usher Gallery in Lincoln, Victoria and Albert Museum and Winnipeg Art Gallery.

Major retrospective exhibitions have been held at Tate Britain (1983–84), the Dulwich Picture Gallery, the Imperial War Museum, the River and Rowing Museum, Museum of Reading and Dorchester Abbey. In 2012 an exhibition, John Piper and the Church, curated by Patricia Jordan Evans of Bohun Gallery, examined his relationship with the Church and his contribution to the development of modern art within churches. In 2016, the Pallant House Gallery mounted an exhibition entitled John Piper: The Fabric of Modernism which focused on Piper's textile designs, while 2017/ 2018 saw Tate Liverpool and Mead Gallery at Warwick Arts Centre mount a joint exhibition focusing on Piper's early career, with an emphasis on the 1930s and 1940s. The River and Rowing Museum at Henley-on-Thames maintains a gallery dedicated to Piper.

Published works
 Oxfordshire, Shell Guide No. 11, 1938, (Faber & Faber).
 British Romantic Artists, 1942, (Collins), published as Volume 34 of Britain in Pictures.
 Buildings and Prospects, 1948, (London: Architectural Press), a collection of published articles.
 Romney Marsh, Illustrated and Described by John Piper, 1950, King Penguin No. 55, Penguin Books.
 Shropshire, A Shell Guide, 1951, with John Betjeman,.
 Stained Glass: Art or Anti-Art ?, 1968, booklet.
 Piper's Places: John Piper in England and Wales, 1983, with Richard Ingrams,(London: Chatto & Windus, The Hogarth Press).

Stained glass
Examples of stained glass designed by John Piper:

References

Further reading
 Bowen, Jane (curator), John Piper Centenary: Crossing Boundaries (2002).
 Davis, Howard, A Great Job of Work For All Time. John Piper – Unknown Mosaicist, Andamento No. 3 (2009 [British Association for Modern Mosaic]) 
 Heathcote, David, A Shell Eye on England: The Shell County Guides 1934–1984 (Faringdon: Libri Publishing, 2010) (ISBN 978-1- 907471-07-0)
 Jenkins, David Fraser, & John Piper, A Painter's Camera (London: Tate Gallery Publications, 1987)
 Jenkins, David Fraser, John Piper – The Robert and Rena Lewin Gift to the Ashmolean Museum (Oxford: Ashmolean Museum, 1992).
 Levinson, Orde, Quality and Experiment: The Prints of John Piper — A Catalogue Raisonné 1932–91 (London: Lund Humphries Publishers, 1996).
 Powers, Alan, et al., Piper in Print (Artist's Choice Edition, 2010).
 West, Anthony, John Piper (Secker & Warburg, 1979).
 Woods, S. John, John Piper Paintings Drawings & Theatre Designs 1932–1954 (New York: Curt Valentin, 1955)
 Wortley, Laura, John Piper – Master of Diversity (Henley-on-Thames: River and Rowing Museum, 2000)  
 John Piper (1983, Tate Gallery)
 John Piper, "Book illustration and the painter-artist", in Penrose Annual; 43 (1949), p. 52–54
 John Piper and the Church exhibition catalogue, edited by Patricia Jordan Evans and Joanna Cartwright (2012)

External links
 

1903 births
1992 deaths
20th-century English male artists
20th-century English painters
Alumni of the Royal College of Art
Benjamin Britten
British war artists
English male painters
English printmakers
English scenic designers
English stained glass artists and manufacturers
English watercolourists
Collage artists
Members of the Order of the Companions of Honour
Modern painters
People associated with the Tate galleries
People educated at Epsom College
John
World War II artists